Diplacus pictus is a species of monkeyflower known by the common name calico monkeyflower.

Distribution
The wildflower is endemic to California, found only above the southeastern San Joaquin Valley within Kern County and Tulare County.

It grows in open California oak woodland habitat, in bare rocky soils around granite outcrops.

It is a listed Endangered species on the California Native Plant Society Inventory of Rare and Endangered Plants.

Description

The stem is hairy and rectangular in cross-section. The oppositely arranged leaves are somewhat oval in shape and up to 4.5 centimeters long.

The tubular base of the flower is encapsulated in a dark reddish calyx of sepals with uneven lobes. The five-lobed flower has a maroon throat and the circular face is white with bold and intricately patterned purple-brown veining. The bloom period varies from March to May.

References

External links
Calflora Database: Mimulus pictus (Calico monkeyflower)
Jepson Manual eFlora (TJM2) treatment of Mimulus pictus
USDA Plants Profile for Mimulus pictus (calico monkeyflower)
UC CalPhotos gallery − Mimulus pictus

pictus
Endemic flora of California
Flora of the Sierra Nevada (United States)
~
Natural history of the California chaparral and woodlands
Natural history of Kern County, California
Natural history of Tulare County, California
Flora without expected TNC conservation status